Small World is the seventh studio album by the English electronic band Metronomy. It was released on 18 February 2022 by Because Music.

Critical reception 

Small World received generally favourable reviews from music critics. At Metacritic, which assigns a normalised rating out of 100 to reviews from mainstream publications, the album received an average score of 72, based on 11 reviews. Commenting on the album's sound difference from previous Metronomy albums, NME wrote that the album "might be the biggest diversion of their main stage sound to date, but it's one of the most heartfelt and rewarding".

Track listing 

 All of the tracks except "Life and Death" and "Love Factory" are stylised beginning with a capital letter, but the rest are lowercase.

 All of the tracks except "Life and Death" and "Love Factory" are stylised beginning with a capital letter, but the rest are lowercase.

Personnel 
 Joseph Mount – drums, bass guitar, Roland Juno 60, Yamaha D85 Organ, Roland System 100, production
 Oscar Cash – piano, acoustic guitar, electric guitar, Yamaha D85 Organ
 Raven Bush – strings (7, 8)
 Dana Margolin – vocals (8)
 Ash Workman – production, mixing
 Matt Colton – mastering
 Kate Mount – sleeve photography
 Hazel Gaskin – Metronomy photography
 The Letter Press – design

Charts

References 

2022 albums
Metronomy albums